Anikó is a Hungarian female given name, derived from Anna.

Variant forms
Alternate forms of Anikó:
Anka
Annika
Anda 
Anett 
Anica 
Anika 
Anita

People
Anikó Kapros, Professional Hungarian tennis player
Anikó Pelle, International water polo player from Hungary 
Anikó Szebenszky, Hungarian race walker 
Anikó Kántor, Hungarian handball player and Olympic medalist
Anikó Nagy, Hungarian handball player and Olympic medalist
Anikó Góg, Hungarian athlete
Anikó Meksz, Hungarian handball player
Hannah Szenes (or Chana Senesh, originally Szenes Anikó)

External links
Aniko - name meaning and origin

Hungarian feminine given names